The Lawrence Joel Veterans Memorial Coliseum (also known as LJVM Coliseum, Joel Coliseum or simply The Joel) is a 14,407-seat multi-purpose arena, in Winston-Salem, North Carolina. Construction on the arena began on April 23, 1987, and it opened on August 28, 1989. It was named after Lawrence Joel, an Army medic from Winston-Salem who was awarded the Medal of Honor in 1967 for action in Vietnam on November 8, 1965. The memorial was designed by James Ford in New York, and includes the poem "The Fallen" engraved on an interior wall. It is home to the Wake Forest University Demon Deacons men's basketball and women's basketball teams, and is adjacent to the Carolina Classic Fairgrounds. The arena replaced the old Winston-Salem Memorial Coliseum, which was torn down for the LJVM Coliseum's construction.

Events

Basketball

The Coliseum is primarily home to the Wake Forest University men's and women's basketball teams. Its construction allowed Wake Forest to move all of its home games to Winston-Salem for the first time in three decades. Since 1959, they had moved the bulk of their ACC schedule to the larger Greensboro Coliseum, as well as other games against popular opponents that could not be accommodated at the 8,500-seat Memorial Coliseum.

However, other basketball games are held there, such as the Frank Spencer Holiday Classic basketball tournament, an annual event for high school basketball teams in the area.  Since 2003, the LJVM has hosted the North Carolina High School Athletic Association (NCHSAA) Western Regional Basketball Tournaments. 
The LJVM was the site of the Central Intercollegiate Athletic Association (CIAA) basketball tournament from 1994 to 1999.  Also, the first and second rounds of the NCAA Men's Division I Basketball Championship have been held at the Coliseum four times (1993, 1997, 2000 and 2007).  It also hosted the MEAC men's basketball tournament from 2009 to 2012.

In a memorable NCAA second-round game at the Coliseum on March 15, 1997, North Carolina gave head coach Dean Smith victory number 877, surpassing Kentucky legend Adolph Rupp as the winningest college basketball coach in history.

The Harlem Globetrotters have played in the Coliseum as well.

Wrestling
It hosted the annual Fall Brawl pay-per-view event from 1996 to 1999 which also featured the WarGames matches from 1996 to 1998.

Concerts
The arena has hosted concerts by many famous artists, spanning many different genres. The LJVM's amply large size makes it an ideal location for performers who wish to perform at smaller venues. The main arena can also be curtained off to create a theater-like setting.

Other events

The LJVM has played host to large-scale events such as the quarterfinals of the 2007 Davis Cup, but has also hosted racing, bull riding, circus, religious conferences, conventions and other events.

Barney's third stage show, and first national stage show tour Barney’s Big Surprise was taped at the coliseum in 1997 and was released in 1998

The movie The Longest Ride filmed a bull riding scene at the Coliseum in August 2014.

Coliseum Complex

Prior to being purchased by Wake Forest in 2013, the LJVM was the centerpiece of the Winston-Salem Entertainment-Sports Complex. This complex originally included Joel Coliseum, Truist Field (Groves Stadium), David F. Couch Ballpark (Ernie Shore Field), the Fairgrounds Annex and the off-site Bowman-Gray Stadium.

Ownership
The Winston-Salem Foundation donated the land the coliseum now sits on to the city of Winston-Salem in 1969. The city of Winston-Salem completed construction of the coliseum in 1989 at a cost of $20.1 million. On May 20, 2013, the Winston-Salem city council approved the sale of the Joel Coliseum to Wake Forest University for $8 million. Wake Forest may consider buying the naming rights to the arena as well, which is currently owned by the city. Wake Forest University completed the purchase of Lawrence Joel Veterans Memorial Coliseum and the surrounding 33 acres on August 1, 2013. Wake Forest has made numerous upgrades to the coliseum, including LED court lighting, which improved energy costs, and a 1,400-foot center hung display monitor at mid-court.

See also
 List of NCAA Division I basketball arenas

References

External links
 

1989 establishments in North Carolina
Basketball venues in North Carolina
College basketball venues in the United States
Event venues established in 1989
Indoor ice hockey venues in the United States
Sports venues in Winston-Salem, North Carolina
Wake Forest Demon Deacons basketball venues
Winston-Salem State Rams men's basketball
Sports venues completed in 1989